Cerro Chilinchilín is a mountain in the Andes of Chile. It has a height of 4506 metres.

See also
List of mountains in the Andes

References

Mountains of Chile